Milly, Molly, a Singapore-New Zealand co-produced animated series based on the books, was produced in 2007. An agreement for a second season was made in early 2009. The two young actors, Savannah Lind and Madeline Flood, worked on the TV show. The voice of Aunt Maude was Cornelia Frances. Produced for the Australian Broadcasting Corporation by Milly Molly Group Holdings, Scrawl Studios and Beyond Productions in association with the Media Development Authority of Singapore

Premise 
The story of Molly, and her friend Milly, help to solves problems, and have ideas for and enchantment and modern creativity.

Broadcast 
The series was also broadcast on Disney Junior in the United Kingdom, and returned on ITVBe's LittleBe Between 3 September 2016 and 28 August 2019, and shown on Discovery Kids (Latin American TV channel). Irises language Gaeilge by Dublin-based studios Macalla Teoranta for TG4, and is called Milly, Molly in Singapore. A Bangla dubbed version of the series was aired on Duronto TV in Bangladesh.

References

External links
 

2000s animated television series
2010s British children's television series
2010 British television series debuts
2011 British television series endings
Animated television series about children
Animated television series about dragons
British children's animated adventure television series
British children's animated fantasy television series
British television shows based on children's books
Television series about princesses
British preschool education television series
Animated preschool education television series
2010s preschool education television series
South African animated television series
South African children's television series
English-language television shows